In mathematics, particularly differential topology, the double tangent bundle or the second tangent bundle refers to the tangent bundle  of the total space TM of the tangent bundle  of a smooth manifold M
. A note on notation: in this article, we denote projection maps by their domains, e.g., πTTM : TTM → TM. Some authors index these maps by their ranges instead, so for them, that map would be written πTM.

The second tangent bundle arises in the study of connections and second order ordinary differential equations, i.e., (semi)spray structures on smooth manifolds, and it is not to be confused with the second order jet bundle.

Secondary vector bundle structure and canonical flip 

Since  is a vector bundle in its own right, its tangent bundle has the secondary vector bundle structure  where  is the push-forward of the canonical projection 
In the following we denote

and apply the associated coordinate system

on TM. Then the fibre of the secondary vector bundle structure at X∈TxM takes the form

The double tangent bundle is a double vector bundle.

The canonical flip is a smooth involution j:TTM→TTM that exchanges these vector space structures

The canonical flip has the property that for any f: R2 → M, 
 
where s and t are coordinates of the standard basis of R 2. Note that both partial derivatives are functions from R2 to TTM.

This property can, in fact, be used to give an intrinsic definition of the canonical flip. Indeed, there is a submersion
p: J20 (R2,M) → TTM given by 

where p can be defined in the space of two-jets at zero because only depends on f up to order two at zero. We consider the application:

where α(s,t)= (t,s). Then J is compatible with the projection p and induces the canonical flip on the quotient TTM.

Canonical tensor fields on the tangent bundle

As for any vector bundle, the tangent spaces  of the fibres TxM of the tangent bundle  can be identified with the fibres TxM themselves. Formally this is achieved through the vertical lift, which is a natural vector space isomorphism
 defined as

The vertical lift can also be seen as a natural vector bundle isomorphism

The vertical lift lets us define the canonical vector field

which is smooth in the slit tangent bundle TM\0. The canonical vector field can be also defined as the infinitesimal generator of the Lie-group action

Unlike the canonical vector field, which can be defined for any vector bundle, the canonical endomorphism

is special to the tangent bundle. The canonical endomorphism J satisfies

and it is also known as the tangent structure for the following reason. If (E,p,M) is any vector bundle
with the canonical vector field V and a (1,1)-tensor field J that satisfies the properties listed above, with VE in place of VTM, then the vector bundle (E,p,M) is isomorphic to the tangent bundle  of the base manifold, and J corresponds to the tangent structure of TM in this isomorphism.

There is also a stronger result of this kind  which states that if N is a 2n-dimensional manifold and if there exists a (1,1)-tensor field J on N that satisfies

then N is diffeomorphic to an open set of the total space of a tangent bundle of some n-dimensional manifold M, and J corresponds to the tangent structure of TM in this diffeomorphism.

In any associated coordinate system on TM the canonical vector field and the canonical endomorphism have the coordinate representations

(Semi)spray structures 

A Semispray structure on a smooth manifold M is by definition a smooth vector field H on TM \0 such that JH=V. An equivalent definition is that j(H)=H, where j:TTM→TTM is the canonical flip. A semispray H is a spray, if in addition, [V,H]=H.

Spray and semispray structures are invariant versions of second order ordinary differential equations on M. The difference between spray and semispray structures is that the solution curves of sprays are invariant in positive reparametrizations as point sets on M, whereas solution curves of semisprays typically are not.

Nonlinear covariant derivatives on smooth manifolds 

The canonical flip makes it possible to define nonlinear covariant derivatives on smooth manifolds as follows. Let

be an Ehresmann connection on the slit tangent bundle TM\0 and consider the mapping

where Y*:TM→TTM is the push-forward, j:TTM→TTM is the canonical flip and κ:T(TM/0)→TM/0 is the connector map. The mapping DX is a derivation in the module Γ (TM) of smooth vector fields on M in the sense that

 .
 .

Any mapping DX with these properties is called a (nonlinear) covariant derivative
 on M.
The term nonlinear refers to the fact that this kind of covariant derivative DX on is not necessarily linear with respect to the direction X∈TM/0 of the differentiation.

Looking at the local representations one can confirm that the Ehresmann connections on (TM/0,πTM/0,M) and nonlinear covariant derivatives on M are in one-to-one correspondence. Furthermore, if DX is linear in X, then the Ehresmann connection is linear in the secondary vector bundle structure, and DX coincides with its linear covariant derivative.

See also 

 Spray (mathematics)
 Secondary vector bundle structure
 Finsler manifold

References 

Differential geometry
Topology